or Mushi Pro for short, is a Japanese animation studio headquartered in Fujimidai, Nerima, Tokyo, Japan. It previously had a headquarters elsewhere in Nerima.

The studio was headed by manga artist Osamu Tezuka. Tezuka started it as a rivalry with Toei Animation, his former employer, after Tezuka's contract with Toei expired in 1961. The studio pioneered TV animation in Japan, and was responsible for many successful anime television series, such as Astro Boy, Gokū no Daibōken, Princess Knight, Kimba the White Lion, Dororo and Ashita no Joe, as well as more adult-oriented feature films such as A Thousand and One Nights, Cleopatra (the first Japanese X-rated animated film) and Belladonna of Sadness.

In addition to doing their anime productions, Mushi was best known for its overseas work on five traditionally animated TV projects from Arthur Rankin, Jr. and Jules Bass' Videocraft International (now Rankin/Bass Productions) in New York, New York, including the Christmas special Frosty the Snowman, with the production artwork being done by Paul Coker, Jr., along with the animation supervision by Yusaku "Steve" Nakagawa.

Morisawa argues that Tezuka "proposed an unrealistically suppressed production budget... in an attempt to outbid his competitors", a budget that contributed to the Studio's (and industry at the time) low profitability. Mushi, plagued by financial difficulties, declared bankruptcy in 1973 and its assets were divided. Tezuka had already left the company by then, having stepped down as acting director in 1968 and formed a new animation studio, Tezuka Productions (which made such works as Marvelous Melmo and Unico). The company was later reestablished in November 26, 1977, and has continued to operate ever since.

Productions

Original (1962-1973)
(based on the works of Osamu Tezuka)

Films
Tales of a Street Corner (November 5, 1962) - experimental film
Male (November 5, 1962) - experimental film
Memory (September 21, 1964) - experimental film
Mermaid (September 21, 1964) - experimental film
Mighty Atom, the Brave in Space (July 26, 1964)
Cigarettes and Ashes (October 1, 1965) - experimental film
The Drop (October 1, 1965) - experimental film
Jungle Emperor Leo Movie (July 31, 1966)
Pictures at an Exhibition (November 11, 1966) - experimental film
Genesis (October 1, 1968) - experimental film

Television series
Tetsuwan Atomu (Astro Boy) (January 1, 1963 – December 31, 1966)
Ginga Shōnen Tai (Galaxy Boy Troop) (April 7, 1963 – April 1, 1965)
Wandā Surī (The Amazing 3) (June 6, 1965 – June 27, 1966)
Janguru Taitei (Kimba the White Lion) (October 6, 1965 – September 28, 1966)
Shin Janguru Taitei: Susume Reo! (Leo the Lion) (October 5, 1966 – March 29, 1967)
Gokū no Daibōken (Adventures of the Monkey King) (January 7, 1967 – September 30, 1967)
Ribon no Kishi (Princess Knight) (April 2, 1967 – April 7, 1968)
 Banpaiya (Vampire) (October 5, 1968 – March 29, 1969)
Dororo (April 6, 1969 – September 28, 1969)
Wansa-kun (Little Wansa) (April 2, 1973 – September 24, 1973)

Television specials
Shin Takarajima (New Treasure Island) (January 3, 1965)
Son Goku ga hajimaru yo! kofudaio no maki (Son Goku Is About to Begin! Volume of the Great Yellow Wind) (June 12, 1966) - Pilot
Ribon no Kishi (Ribbon Knight) (1966; produced in November 1966, unaired) - Pilot
Flying Ben (September 1967) - Pilot
Dororo (January 1968) - Pilot
Gum Gum Punch (April 1968) - Pilot
Zero-Man (June 1968) - Pilot
Norman (July 1968) - Pilot
Space Journey: The First Dream of Wonder-kun (January 2, 1969)
Astro Boy vs. the Giants (Kyojin no Hoshi tai Tetsuwan Atomu) (June 9, 1969, co-production with Tokyo Movie Shinsha and A Production)
Till a City Beneath the Sea is Built (February 2, 1969)
Blue Triton (October 1971) - Pilot

Non-original (1968-present)
(original TV/film productions, or adaptations of other material)

Television series
Wanpaku Tanteidan (February 2, 1968 - September 26, 1968)
Sabu to Ichi Torimono Hikae (October 3, 1968 – September 24, 1969; co-production with Toei Animation and Studio Zero)
Animal 1 (April 1, 1968 – September 30, 1968)
Moomin (October 5, 1969 – December 27, 1970; produced the anime from episode 27 to the final episode, the production from episode 1 to episode 26 was from Tokyo Movie Shinsha)
Ashita no Joe (April 1, 1970 – September 29, 1971; original; second series was created by Tokyo Movie Shinsha)
Andersen Monogatari (January 3, 1971 – December 26, 1971; co-production with Zuiyo Enterprise)
Wandering Sun (April 8, 1971 – September 30, 1971)
Kunimatsu-sama no Otōridai (October 6, 1971 - September 25, 1972)
Vicky the Viking (1974; episodes 1-26 only)
Wonder Beat Scramble (April 16, 1986 – November 19, 1986) - co-produced with Magic Bus

Films
Animerama (film series)
A Thousand and One Nights (June 14, 1969)
Cleopatra (September 15, 1970) - Next-to-first film to be given the self-applied "X" rating in the United States.
Belladonna of Sadness (June 30, 1973)
Yasashii Lion (March 21, 1970) - short film
Adventures of the Polar Cubs (July 21, 1979)
Ashita no Joe (March 8, 1980) - compilation film of the 1970-1971 series
Yuki (August 9, 1981)
Wata no Kunihoshi (February 11, 1984)
Hi no Ame ga Furu (September 15, 1988)
Ise-wan Taifu Monogatari (November 4, 1989)
Ushiro no Shoumen Daare (March 9, 1991)
Zō Ressha ga Yatte Kita (July 4, 1992)
Senbon Matsubara: Kawa to Ikiru Shōnen-tachi (July 11, 1992) - co-produced with Magic Bus
Tsuru ni Notte - Tomoko no Bōken (July 17, 1993) - short film
Raiyantsūrii no Uta (January 6, 1994)
Pipi Tobenai Hotaru (March 23, 1996)
Maya no Isshou (August 20, 1996)
Eikō e no Spur: Igaya Chiharu Monogatari (September 13, 1997)
Ecchan no Sensou (January 13, 2002)
Asu o Tsukutta Otoko - Tanabe Sakuro to Biwako Sosui (March 13, 2003)
Nagasaki 1945: Angelus no Kane (September 9, 2005)
Pattenrai!! ~ Minami no Shima no Mizu Monogatari (November 15, 2008)
Hikawa Maru Monogatari (August 22, 2015)

OVAs
Toki-iro Kaima (March 20, 1989 - February 25, 1990)
Blue Sonnet (July 16, 1989 – June 25, 1990)
Legend of the Galactic Heroes (1997, episodes 100 and 106)
Kuzuryuugawa to Shounen (October, 1998)
Legend of the Galactic Heroes: A Hundred Billion Stars, A Hundred Billion Lights (1998, episodes 15, 18, and 19)
Kaitou Gary no Nihonjin Kouryakuhou! (1999)
Kuma no Minakuro to Kouhei Jiisan (1999)
Kochira Tamago Outou Negaimasu (2008)

Conmission work
Frosty the Snowman (December 7, 1969; American production by Rankin/Bass Productions with animation by Mushi Production)
The Mad, Mad, Mad Comedians (April 7, 1970; American production by Rankin/Bass Productions with animation by Mushi Production)
The Reluctant Dragon and Mr. Toad Show (September 12, 1970 – December 26, 1970; American production by Rankin/Bass Productions with animation by Mushi Production)
Mad Mad Mad Monsters (September 23, 1972; American production by Rankin/Bass Productions with animation by Mushi Production)
Festival of Family Classics (January 1, 1972 – November 26, 1973; American production by Rankin/Bass Productions with animation by Mushi Production and Topcraft; 17 episodes)

See also
 Tama Production, an animation studio founded in 1965 by former Mushi Production animator Eiji Tanaka, but gone bankrupt in 2011
 Tezuka Productions, an animation studio founded in 1968 as a spun-off division by Tezuka
 Group TAC, an animation studio founded by former Mushi Productions employees, including sound effects director Atsumi Tashiro, and animators Susumu Akitagawa and Gisaburo Sugii, went bankrupt in 2010
 Madhouse, an animation studio founded by former Mushi Production animators, including Masao Maruyama, Osamu Dezaki, Rintaro and Yoshiaki Kawajiri
 Sunrise, an animation studio founded by former Mushi Production animators
 Studio Pierrot, an animation studio founded by former Mushi Pro employees, along with the other employees from Tatsunoko
 Kyoto Animation, an animation studio founded in Kyoto by former Mushi Pro staff
 Shaft, a studio formerly concerned with cel work that eventually branched off into original productions, founded in 1975 by Hiroshi Wakao
 Studio Gallop, animated studio founded in 1978 by former Mushi Pro staffers

References

External links 

  (Japanese)
 Article and interview over Mushi Production (German)
 

 
Japanese animation studios
Osamu Tezuka
Nerima
Animation studios in Tokyo